George N. Appenzeller is a United States Army major general who has served as the deputy surgeon general of the United States Army since December 2022 and deputy commanding general for operations of the United States Army Medical Command since July 2022. He most recently served as the assistant director for combat support and director of healthcare operations of the Defense Health Agency from July 2020 to July 2022. Previously, he served as the commanding general of Regional Health Command-Central from July 16, 2019 to July 2, 2020.

References

Living people
Place of birth missing (living people)
Recipients of the Defense Superior Service Medal
Recipients of the Legion of Merit
United States Army generals
United States Army personnel of the Iraq War
Year of birth missing (living people)